Garcinia prainiana, known as the button mangosteen or cherapu is a species of Garcinia. It has a flavor similar to, but distinct from, its cousin, the purple mangosteen, with an interesting taste some have compared to a tangerine, but unlike its cousin, it has a tissue-thin skin rather than a hard rind, making it much easier to eat out-of-hand. Also unlike the purple mangosteen, it can be grown in a container. The fruit is cultivated in Southeast Asia, by a few backyard growers in South Florida, and at the Whitman Tropical Fruit Pavilion at Florida's Fairchild Tropical Botanic Garden.

It is a native of Malaysia and Thailand. The tree is small or medium-sized. It was featured in Malaysian 30 cents stamp, printed in 21-Feb-1999.

References

External links
Tradewinds Fruit:Button Mangosteen

prainiana
Least concern plants